Thomas Platter the Younger (c. 24 July 1574 in Basel – 4 December 1628 in Basel) was a Swiss-born physician, traveller and diarist, the son of the humanist Thomas Platter the Elder.

The foremost record of Platter's life is the manuscript journal he kept, written in German, between around 1595 and 1600. It details his life as a medical student in Montpellier and his later travels in France, Spain, Flanders, and England. The diary supplies detail on many aspects of late sixteenth-century European culture: medical education (including dissections), street and carnival life in Barcelona, European theatre, and the practicalities of the slave trade.

Perhaps the most studied section of Platter's diary is his account of a 1599 trip to London with his older half-brother, Felix Platter, including a visit on 21 September, "at about two o'clock", to the Globe Theatre, where Platter saw an early production of Julius Caesar. His account provides Shakespeare scholars with evidence for the dating of that play.

Editions

References

1536 births
1628 deaths
Swiss diarists
16th-century Swiss physicians
17th-century Swiss physicians
16th-century diarists
17th-century diarists